Bumsuz is a town (belde) in the District of Haymana, Ankara Province, Turkey. The town had a population of 649 in 2020.

The town is populated by Kurds.

References 

Populated places in Ankara Province
Kurdish settlements in Ankara Province